= Physical Geography (journal) =

Scientific journal

- Discipline: Geography
- Language: English
- Edited by: Chris Houser

Publication details
- History: 1980–present
- Publisher: Taylor & Francis
- Frequency: Bimonthly
- Impact factor: 2.075 (2021)

Standard abbreviations
- ISO 4: Phys. Geogr.

Indexing
- ISSN: 0272-3646 (print); 1930-0557 (web)
- LCCN: 81640062
- OCLC no.: 888457727

Links
- Journal homepage; Online access; Online archive

Physical Geography is a bimonthly peer-reviewed scientific journal covering all aspects of physical geography. It was established in 1980 and is published by Taylor & Francis. It was originally published by Bellwether Publishing until the start of the 34th volume in 2013, when it moved to Taylor & Francis. The editor-in-chief is Chris Houser (University of Windsor). According to the Journal Citation Reports, the journal has a 2021 impact factor of 2.075.
